The following is a list of the 273 communes of the Savoie department of France.

The communes cooperate in the following intercommunalities (as of 2020):
Communauté d'agglomération Arlysère
Communauté d'agglomération Grand Chambéry
Communauté d'agglomération Grand Lac
Communauté de communes du Canton de La Chambre
Communauté de communes Cœur de Chartreuse (partly)
Communauté de communes Cœur de Maurienne Arvan
Communauté de communes Cœur de Savoie
Communauté de communes Cœur de Tarentaise
Communauté de communes Haute Maurienne Vanoise
Communauté de communes de Haute Tarentaise
Communauté de communes du Lac d'Aiguebelette
Communauté de communes Maurienne-Galibier
Communauté de communes Porte de Maurienne
Communauté de communes Val Guiers
Communauté de communes Val Vanoise
Communauté de communes des Vallées d’Aigueblanche
Communauté de communes Les Versants d’Aime
Communauté de communes de Yenne

References

Savoie